Douglas W. Gablinske (born 1953) was an American politician who was  a member of the Rhode Island House of Representatives, representing the Democratic party for the 68th District since 2007. During the 2009-10 sessions, he served on the House Committees on Finance, Small Business, Labor, Separation of Powers and served as Chairman of the Subcommittee on Education. Gablinske was defeated in the 14 September 2010 Democratic Primary to Richard P. Morrisson, who went on to win the general election on 2 November 2010. Gablinske was successfully targeted for defeat by the Rhode Island Labor Movement for his anti-union rhetoric.

References

External links
Rhode Island House - Representative Douglas Gablinske official RI House website

Democratic Party members of the Rhode Island House of Representatives
1953 births
Living people
People from Bristol, Rhode Island
Place of birth missing (living people)